Nikolay Vladimirovich Lipatkin (born 23 May 1986) is a Russian former professional association football player.

Club career
He made his Russian Football National League debut for FC MVD Rossii Moscow on 8 April 2009 in a game against FC Metallurg Lipetsk.

External links
 
 

1986 births
Footballers from Moscow
Living people
Russian footballers
Russian expatriate footballers
Expatriate footballers in Belarus
Russian expatriate sportspeople in Belarus
Association football midfielders
FC Dynamo Moscow reserves players
FC Sibir Novosibirsk players
FC Gomel players
FC Petrotrest players
FC Khimki players
Belarusian Premier League players
FC MVD Rossii Moscow players